The secretary of state for culture, media and sport, also referred to as the culture secretary, is a secretary of state in the Government of the United Kingdom, with overall responsibility for strategy and policy across the Department for Culture, Media and Sport. The incumbent is a member of the Cabinet of the United Kingdom. The office has been dubbed "Minister of Fun".

Responsibilities 
The secretary has overall responsibility for strategy and policy across the Department for Digital, Culture, Media and Sport. Responsibilities include:

 Arts and Culture
 Broadcasting
 Creative industries
 Creative Industries Council
 Cultural property, heritage and the historic environment
 Cultural Renewal Taskforce
 Culture, sports and arts sector recovery from COVID-19
 Data Protection Regulator - the ICO (Information Commissioners Office) 
 Gambling and racing
 Libraries
 Media ownership and mergers
 Museums and galleries
 The National Lottery
 Sport
 Telecommunications and online
 Tourism

History 
The office was created in 1992 by Prime Minister John Major, as Secretary of State for National Heritage. In his autobiography, Major says that, before the office was created, responsibility for cultural interests was shared among various departments, but important to none of them. For instance, arts and libraries, although a separate department, had no minister in the Cabinet, sport was part of the Department for Education, film was part of the Department of Trade and Industry, broadcasting was part of the Home Office, tourism was part of the Department for Employment and heritage was part of the Department of the Environment. He also wrote that the system tended to favour the interests of the articulate and well-connected London-based arts lobby.

Thus, when he became Prime Minister, Major said that he saw that the only way to give culture and sport the higher profile that he thought that they deserved was to establish a new department, under a minister of Cabinet rank, to bring together all aspects of the arts, sport and heritage.

List of secretaries of state

See also
 Shadow Secretary of State for Culture, Media and Sport
 Digital, Culture, Media and Sport Committee

References

Culture, Media and Sport
United Kingdom
Ministerial offices in the United Kingdom
Department for Digital, Culture, Media and Sport
1992 establishments in the United Kingdom